The Asian Karate Federation (AKF) is the governing body of sport karate of about 44 countries of karatedo federation in Asia.
 The AKF is a non-profit organization and performs its activities on an amateur basis in compliance with the principles set forth in the Olympic Charter, duly
recognized by the World Karate Federation, the largest international governing body of sport karate with over 198 member countries. It is the only karate organization recognised by the International Olympic Committee and has more than fifty million members.  The AKF organizes the Asian Karatedo Championships, the Junior and Senior AKF Championships in every two years in between the Olympic and Asian Games and participates in WKF World Karate Championships. The Current President of the Asian Karate Federation (AKF) is Major Gen Nasser Al Sayed Abdulrazak Alrazooqi of UAE and  Mr. Kuong Im Che of Macau, China serves as the Secretary General.

History of AKF
Asian Karatedo Federation founded as APUKO (Asian Pacific Union of Karatedo Organizations) in the year 1973.

It changed to AUKO (Asian Union of Karatedo Organizations) in 1992 after WUKO was admitted to IOC.

The name was changed again in 1999 to AKF (Asian Karatedo Federation) in line with World Union of Karate-Do Organizations (WUKO) changed to World Karate Federation (WKF).

AKF Country Member's Federations
 Asian Karate Federation (AKF) Affiliated Countries

 Afghanistan
 Bangladesh
 Bahrain
 Bhutan
 Brunei
 Cambodia
 China
 Hong Kong, China
 Indonesia
 India
 Iraq
 Iran
 Jordan
 Japan
 Kazakhstan
 Korea
 Kuwait
 Kyrgyzstan
 Lao PDR
 Lebanon
 Macau, China
 Malaysia
 Mongolia
 Myanmar
 Nepal
 Oman
 Pakistan
 Philippines
 Palestine
 DPR Korea
 Qatar
 Saudi Arabia
 Singapore
 Sri Lanka
 Syria
 Thailand
 Tajikistan
 Timor-Leste
 Chinese Taipei
 Turkmenistan
 United Arab Emirates
 Uzbekistan
 Vietnam
 Yemen

References

External links
Asian Karatedo Federation official website
World Karate Federation official website

Sports organizations established in 1973
Karate organizations
Kar

ja:世界空手道連盟